Alum Pot is a pothole with a large open shaft at a surface elevation of  on the eastern flanks of Simon Fell, North Yorkshire, England. It connects with nearby Long Churn Cave and Diccan Pot. The pot is accessed via a 1-km private track on payment of a small fee from Selside Farm in the hamlet of Selside in Ribblesdale. Alum Pot has variously been known as Allan, Alan, Allen, Hellen and Hell'n.

History
In 1847 John Birkbeck undertook the first partial descent of Alum Pot from Long Churn Cave which did not reach the floor of the shaft. He returned the following year and made a successful descent, when a group of nine men were lowered to the shaft floor in a large bucket winched down by a group of railway workers.  Another successful complete descent of Alum Pot took place in 1870, when a group of people were lowered to the floor using a cage and windlass operated by navvies working on the Settle–Carlisle Line.  In 1932 a 24-strong group of cavers from the Craven Pothole Club made the first passage from Alum Pot to Diccan Pot.

In July 1936 Mabel Binks became the first caving fatality in the Yorkshire Dales when she was hit by a rock falling down the Main Shaft. Evidence from the inquest indicated that it had been thrown down deliberately.

See also 
 Caving in the United Kingdom
List of caves in the United Kingdom

References

Sources
Lowe, G.T. (1903) Alum Pot. Yorkshire Ramblers' Club Journal Volume 2 Number 5: pp. 35–47. Leeds: YRC

External links
 Yorkshire Ramblers Club website

Caves of North Yorkshire